The Division of Gellibrand is an Australian Electoral Division in Victoria. The division was created in 1949 and is named after Joseph Gellibrand, a pioneer settler of the Melbourne area. It is located in the industrial inner western suburbs of Melbourne and includes Altona, Altona North, Altona Meadows, Kingsville, Laverton, Newport, Seabrook, Seaholme, Seddon, South Kingsville, Spotswood, Williamstown, Williamstown North and Yarraville; and parts of Brooklyn, Footscray, Laverton North, Point Cook, West Footscray and Williams Landing.

Geography
Since 1984, federal electoral division boundaries in Australia have been determined at redistributions by a redistribution committee appointed by the Australian Electoral Commission. Redistributions occur for the boundaries of divisions in a particular state, and they occur every seven years, or sooner if a state's representation entitlement changes or when divisions of a state are malapportioned.

History

The Division has been held by the Australian Labor Party for its entire existence; it is located in Labor's traditional heartland of western Melbourne, and is characterised by a very diverse, multicultural population. Labor has never tallied less than 60 percent of the two-party vote, and until 2010 always won an outright majority on first preferences alone.

Its most prominent members have been Ralph Willis, a Cabinet minister in the Hawke and Keating Governments, and Nicola Roxon, a Cabinet minister in the Rudd Government and the Gillard Government and first female Attorney-General.

In recent years there has been considerable gentrification in the inner-city suburbs such as Footscray, Williamstown and Yarraville, and a consequent rise in the progressive Greens vote, which rose to 37 percent in Footscray in the 2013 election. In the west, a solid patch of working-class suburbia remain strongly Labor-leaning.

For several years, Gellibrand was Labor's safest seat in the Federal Parliament. The current member for Gellibrand since the 2013 election is Labor's Tim Watts.

Members

Election results

References

External links
 Division of Gellibrand - Australian Electoral Commission

Electoral divisions of Australia
Constituencies established in 1949
1949 establishments in Australia
City of Maribyrnong
City of Wyndham
City of Hobsons Bay
Williamstown, Victoria
Electoral districts and divisions of Greater Melbourne